The Green Ripper (1979) is a mystery novel by John D. MacDonald, the 18th of 21 in the Travis McGee series. 
It won a 1980 U.S. National Book Award in the one-year category mystery.

The plot is centered on revenge against a secretive, terrorist cult that is responsible for killing McGee's lover Gretel. The title is a word play on the name of the Grim Reaper.  McGee's friend, Meyer, an economist, features prominently in the novel.

References

 
 

1979 American novels
Travis McGee (novel series)
National Book Award-winning works